Innocent is a 1918 American silent drama film directed by George Fitzmaurice and starring Fannie Ward, John Miltern, and Armand Kaliz.

The film's sets were designed by the art director William Cameron Menzies.

Cast 
 Fannie Ward as Innocent 
 John Miltern as John Wyndham 
 Armand Kaliz as Louis Doucet 
 Frederick Perry as Peter McCormack 
 Rae Allen as Undetermined Role 
 Nathaniel Sack as Undetermined Role

References

Bibliography
 Jay Robert Nash, Robert Connelly & Stanley Ralph Ross. Motion Picture Guide Silent Film 1910-1936. Cinebooks, 1988.

External links

1918 films
1918 drama films
1910s English-language films
American silent feature films
Silent American drama films
American black-and-white films
Films directed by George Fitzmaurice
1910s American films